This article shows the rosters of all participating teams at the 2019 FIVB Volleyball Men's Club World Championship in Betim, Brazil.

Al-Rayyan SC
The following is the roster of the Qatari club Al-Rayyan SC in the 2019 FIVB Volleyball Men's Club World Championship.

 Head coach:  Carlos Schwanke

Cucine Lube Civitanova
The following is the roster of the Italian club Cucine Lube Civitanova in the 2019 FIVB Volleyball Men's Club World Championship.

 Head coach:  Ferdinando De Giorgi

Sada Cruzeiro Vôlei
The following is the roster of the Brazilian club Sada Cruzeiro Vôlei in the 2019 FIVB Volleyball Men's Club World Championship.

 Head coach:  Marcelo Méndez

Zenit Kazan
The following is the roster of the Russian club Zenit Kazan in the 2019 FIVB Volleyball Men's Club World Championship.

 Head coach:  Vladimir Alekno

References

External links
Official website

FIVB Club World Championship squads
FIVB Volleyball Men's Club World Championship squads